Ae-Ri Noort (born 10 January 1983) is a Dutch rowing coxswain who competes in eights. She won silver medals at the 2015 and 2016 European Championships, placing fourth in 2014, and participated in the 2016 Rio Olympics. Noort has a degree in biomedical science from Vrije Universiteit Amsterdam.

References

External links

 
 
 

1983 births
Living people
Dutch female rowers
Coxswains (rowing)
Olympic rowers of the Netherlands
Rowers at the 2016 Summer Olympics
Place of birth missing (living people)
European Rowing Championships medalists
20th-century Dutch women
21st-century Dutch women